Mikhail Nikolaevich Gernet (Russian: Михаил Николаевич Гернет; 24 July [O. S. 12 July] 1874 – 16 January 1953) was a Russian and Soviet criminologist and legal historian who is considered the founder of sociological criminology in Russia.

Gernet taught law at Moscow State University from 1897 on, where he notably opposed the death penalty and introduced the concept of resocialization into Russian criminal law scholarship. In 1911, he took up a post at the Psychoneurological Institute in Moscow. After the Russian Revolution and until his death, he taught at Moscow University again, where he contributed to the Stalinist legal codifications of the 1930s and developed a class-specific theory of law and crime, which influenced Mikhail Reisner among others.

References
 
 

1874 births
1953 deaths
People from Mordovia
20th-century jurists
Imperial Moscow University alumni
Academic staff of Moscow State University
Professorships at the Imperial Moscow University
Stalin Prize winners
Recipients of the Order of the Red Banner of Labour
Soviet jurists
Burials at Vvedenskoye Cemetery
Academics from the Russian Empire